Caenopedina mirabilis is a species of sea urchins of the Family Pedinidae. Their armour is covered with spines. Caenopedina mirabilis was first scientifically described in 1885 by Döderlein.

References

Animals described in 1885
Pedinoida